Miroslav Tuđman (25 May 1946 – 31 January 2021) was a Croatian scientist and politician, the son and eldest child of the first President of Croatia, Franjo Tuđman, and his wife Ankica.

Biography
Tuđman was born in Belgrade, where he completed grade school, before he moved with his family to Zagreb in 1961. He was born on his parents' 1st anniversary. He was named Miroslav after the famous writer Miroslav Krleža who was adored by his father at that period. He graduated from gymnasium and then from the Faculty of Philosophy at the University of Zagreb in 1970. He became part of the faculty, and received a doctorate in information sciences at the same university in 1985. In 1989 he founded the Institute for Information Studies at the Faculty.

He participated in the Croatian War of Independence in 1991, and in 1992 he became the head of the Center for Strategic Research. Later he was the deputy head of the National Security Office and then the founder and leader of the first Croatian Intelligence Agency (HIS) between 1993 and 1998, and then from 1999 to 2000. In 1995, President Tuđman decorated him with the Order of Duke Domagoj, for war-time merit as a member of the political administration of the Ministry of Defence. In 1998 he became a tenured professor at the Faculty of Philosophy.

His first venture into politics was as co-founding member of the briefly active leftist Social Democrats of Croatia (SDSH) together with his friend Antun Vujić in 1990, but he soon switched to his father's party – the conservative Croatian Democratic Union (HDZ). However, he was largely politically inactive during the 1990s. Following his father's death and HDZ's first election defeat in 2000, he ran for the Zagreb Assembly as an independent candidate in the 2001 local elections, winning 7.6% of the vote. 

That same year he and Nenad Ivanković founded a fringe right-wing party Croatian True Revival (HIP), which later cooperated with Croatian Bloc (HB) led by Ivić Pašalić–another HDZ offshoot–but they gained no traction at the 2003 parliamentary election. In 2009 he was a nominally independent candidate in the presidential election, finishing seventh in the first round with 4.09% of the vote.

He later re-joined HDZ and in 2011 won a seat in the parliamentary election on an HDZ ticket in the 7th assembly. He retained his seat in the following three elections in 2015 (8th assembly), 2016 (9th assembly) and 2020 (10th assembly).

Tuđman died on 31 January 2021, at Zagreb's Hospital for Infectious Diseases where he had been hospitalized days earlier due to COVID-19 complications during the COVID-19 pandemic in Croatia.

References

External links
 Miroslav Tuđman at Zagreb Faculty of Philosophy 
 Miroslav Tuđman at HRČAK  
 Miroslav Tuđman at Croatian Encyclopedia 

1946 births
2021 deaths
Politicians from Belgrade
Politicians from Zagreb
Scientists from Belgrade
Scientists from Zagreb
Representatives in the modern Croatian Parliament
Candidates for President of Croatia
Croats of Serbia
Croatian nationalists
Croatian scientists
Croatian Democratic Union politicians
Social Democrats of Croatia politicians
Croatian True Revival politicians
Children of national leaders
Deaths from the COVID-19 pandemic in Croatia
Burials at Mirogoj Cemetery
Academic staff of the University of Zagreb
Order of Duke Domagoj recipients
Miroslav
20th-century Croatian philosophers
21st-century Croatian philosophers
21st-century Croatian politicians